"Drunk in the Morning" is a single by Danish band Lukas Graham. The song was released in Denmark as a digital download on 13 February 2012. It was released as the second single from their debut self-titled debut studio album. The song peaked at number one on the Danish Singles Chart. The song was written by Lukas Forchhammer, Sebastian Fogh, Stefan Forrest, Morten Ristorp, Magnus Larsson and Mark Falgren.

Track listing

Chart performance

Weekly charts

Certifications

Release history

References

2012 songs
2012 singles
Lukas Graham songs
Number-one singles in Denmark
Songs written by Morten Ristorp
Songs written by Lukas Forchhammer
Songs written by Stefan Forrest
Music videos directed by Marc Klasfeld
Copenhagen Records singles